The Mzansi Super League (MSL) was a Twenty20 cricket (T20) franchise league held in South Africa. The competition was established in 2018 by Cricket South Africa (CSA) as a replacement for the failed T20 Global League, but only two editions were played before the competition was itself cancelled in favour of the SA20 competition from 2022/23.

The first edition of the tournament took place in November and December 2018. The South African Broadcasting Corporation broadcast all matches domestically on free-to-air channels.

The league consisted of six franchise teams representing different South African cities. Two editions were played under this format before changes were proposed to reflect the wide structural changes that were announced for South African domestic cricket in 2021, but the competition did not run in 2020 or 2021 due to the COVID 19 pandemic and was then cancelled.

Format

League structure 
Each team played each other twice in a home-and-away round-robin format in the league phase. At the conclusion of the league stage, the top three teams qualified for the playoffs, with the team that topped the table after the league phase progressing to the final as the home side and the second and third placed teams played against each other in a play-off match, with the winner advancing to the final.

Player draft 
Franchises acquired players by means of a player draft. A series of marquee players from the South African national team were drafted first, and teams could also select one international marquee player. After these picks, teams were allocated fourteen picks each with player salaries determined by the round in which they were selected.

Teams
Six franchise teams representing different South African cities competed in the competition. These sides were loosely affiliated with the six franchise teams that played First Class and List-A cricket in the domestic circuit. The sides were:

 Tshwane Spartans
 Jozi Stars
 Nelson Mandela Bay Giants
 Durban Heat
 Cape Town Blitz
 Paarl Rocks

League season and results

References

 
Cricket leagues in South Africa
Twenty20 cricket leagues
2018 establishments in South Africa
Recurring sporting events established in 2018
Professional cricket leagues